Mickey's Halloween Party (formerly known as "Mickey's Halloween Treat" from 2005 until 2007 and Mickey's Trick-or-Treat Party in 2008 and 2009) is an annual Halloween-themed separate admission at the Disneyland Resort in Anaheim, California. An earlier event with the original name had been held in 1995 and 1996 at the Disneyland Park, but was not revived until 2005 at Disney California Adventure. Mickey's Halloween Party was considered to be a more family-friendly response to the scare-centered events Halloween Horror Nights, Knott's Scary Farm, and Six Flags Fright Fest. The event ran at Disney California Adventure through 2009, and returned to the Disneyland park starting in 2010. In 2019, the Party was moved back to Disney California Adventure and retitled Oogie Boogie Bash. Its new features including a water show at Pixar Pier called "Villainous".

Guests are encouraged to dress in costumes, including adults and those over the age of nine years who are normally prohibited from doing so. However, guests dressed as a Disney Character (like Mickey Mouse) are not allowed to have their pictures taken with other guests or sign autographs. Events include trick-or-treating; meet and greets with Disney Princesses, Mickey and Minnie in Halloween costumes and Disney villains; coloring activities for younger guests; and dance parties. For the activities starting in 2010, Disneyland's Halloween Time events - such as Haunted Mansion Holiday, Space Mountain's "Ghost Galaxy" layout and the Halloween themed fireworks show, called "Halloween Screams", featuring the voice of Chris Sarandon as Jack Skellington from The Nightmare Before Christmas - were added into the mix.

All Disney Parks closed indefinitely in March 2020 in response to the COVID-19 pandemic. With theme parks closed through the end of 2020 in California, Mickey's Halloween Party was cancelled for 2020.

References

See also
Mickey's Not-So-Scary Halloween Party

Halloween events in the United States
Festivals in Orange County, California
Mickey Mouse
Walt Disney Parks and Resorts parades